Benjamin Wainiqolo Padarath is a former political candidate in Fiji, who served a prison sentence at Korovou Prison from 2006 to 2007 for manslaughter.

Political foray 
Padarath was the National Alliance Party (NAPF) candidate for the Lami Open Constituency in the parliamentary election held on 6–13 May 2006.  He polled 681 votes, just under 5 percent of the total.

Padarath's mother, Lavenia Padarath, a well-known Fiji Labour Party politician, criticized him on 29 March 2006 for a speech he had made at the opening of the Lami office of his party, calling for political power to remain with indigenous Fijians.  Lavenia Padarath said her son's comments were racist, unnecessary, unwarranted, and contrary to the way he had been brought up. The NAPF leader, Ratu Epeli Ganilau, also disavowed the remarks, saying they were Padarath's personal opinion and not those of the party. Padarath defended himself against accusations of racism, saying that with an Indian father and an indigenous Fijian mother, he could not be racist, but considered that for the sake of political and economic stability, it was best for political power to remain, for now, in indigenous hands.

Manslaughter conviction 
On 26 August 2006, Justice Nazhat Shameem sentenced Padarath to two years' imprisonment for causing death by careless driving on 23 May 2003.  He was fined F$2000 and was disqualified from driving for three years. After leaving a Suva nightclub with Julia Stark, Arieta Bulewa, and Charlotte Peters at 10.40pm that night, he had stopped at the Prouds Triangle.  He and Peters (a well-known Fiji Sun journalist) got out of the vehicle and had a heated argument, but returned to the car when a police vehicle arrived.  Padarath resisted police attempts to enter the vehicle and drove away at high speed, going through two red lights.   Police, driving at 90-100 kilometers per hour, were unable to catch up.  Padarath crashed into a coconut tree opposite the Chinese embassy on Queen Elizabeth Drive, and the car broke in half. Bulewa and Stark were found unconscious on the footpath; Stark died three days later, while Bulewa was hospitalized for over a month.

Padarath's lawyer Neel Shivam asked Shameem to consider Padarath's epilepsy, which required daily medication, but Shameem ruled that he was a danger to the public and needed to be imprisoned. Arrangements could be made for his medication, she said.

Padarath was released on 22 June 2007, to serve the remainder of his sentence extramurally while doing community work at a local church, Fiji Television reported on 25 June.  Assistant Commissioner of Prisons Auta Moceisuva said that Padarath had been released under Section 67 of the Prisons Act.

In April 2021 he was detained by the Fiji Independent Commission Against Corruption and charged with sedition and attempting to pervert the course of justice for facebook posts criticising them.

References

1970 births
Fijian people of Indian descent
Living people
Fijian people convicted of manslaughter
Fijian prisoners and detainees
National Alliance Party of Fiji politicians
Fijian people of I-Taukei Fijian descent
Politicians from Lami, Fiji